Tastemade, Inc. a video network that offers food- and travel-related programming for online audiences.

Overview

Founded in 2012 by Larry Fitzgibbon, Steven Kydd and Joe Perez in Santa Monica, California, Tastemade is a global, digital food and travel network for millennials that lets users explore cuisine from around the world through a mix of original content and user-submitted videos. Tastemade's content reaches over 100 million people a month across over 200 countries. Tastemade's content is available on Facebook, Instagram, Snapchat, Prime Video Channels, Apple TV Channels, Pinterest, Roku, YouTube TV, TiVo+, DirecTV, Sling TV and  Tastemade's website and the service's app. More than half of Tastemade's views happen on mobile devices and connected TVs.

History

In 2014, Tastemade's original program Thirsty For... won a James Beard Award in the New Media category for Video Webcast, Fixed Location and/or Instructional. That same year, The Perennial Plate, a documentary series about sustainable food practices on the Tastemade network, also won a James Beard Award in the New Media category for Video Webcast, on Location. The Grill Iron, a Tastemade travel show about college football tailgating, generated over 5 million total views and was nominated for a James Beard Award in 2015. Later, The Grill Iron became Tastemade's first show to migrate from digital to broadcast television in September 2015. In 2016, Tastemade won a Webby Award in the Online Film & Video category for Documentary Series for its show, Heritage.

In early 2015, Apple added the Tastemade channel to its Apple TV device. That same year, Tastemade was named one of the World's Top 10 Most Innovative Companies by Fast Company.

Tastemade was the third most viewed channel in the world on Facebook in July 2016. In July 2015, Facebook began testing a revenue sharing program with its video partners, Tastemade being among them. Tastemade is also part of Facebook's Anthology program, which creates video ads by teaming up advertisers and publishers. In April 2016, Tastemade announced an agreement with Facebook to produce and air 100 Facebook Live shows every month.

Tastemade debuted as one of Snapchat's new publishers on its Discover platform in August 2015, producing original food and travel content for the app on a daily basis. The following month, Tastemade's Snapchat Discover channel launched in the United Kingdom and France. Tastemade's Snapchat channel was nominated for a Webby Award in 2016.

Funding

In 2014, Tastemade announced $25 million in series C funding, led by Scripps Networks Interactive with participation by Liberty Media Corporation, bringing the startup's total funding to $40 million. In December 2015, Tastemade secured a $40 million Series D funding round led by Goldman Sachs, with participation from existing investors Redpoint Ventures, Raine Ventures, Comcast Ventures, Liberty Media, Scripps Networks Interactive, and Tohokushinsha Film Corporation, bringing the total funding to $80 million. In October 2018, Tastemade closed a $35M Series E funding round led by Goldman Sachs Growth Equity along with new investors Amazon and Cool Japan Fund, with participation from existing investors including Redpoint Ventures, Raine Ventures, Comcast Ventures, and Liberty Media, bringing total funding to $115 million.

Network sponsors
Tastemade's original programming has attracted sponsors including Grey Goose, Stella Artois, Chase, Kraft Foods, General Mills, Hyundai, American Express, Visa, San Pellegrino, Starbucks, Unilever, Realtor.com, and others. Tastemade released the findings of a study commissioned from Nielsen which showed that integrating brands into the content resonated better with viewers. Specifically, the study found that brand integration resulted in much higher brand affinity, perception and recall, and increased purchase intent by 30 percent.

Programming

Tastemade's original programming includes the shows Thirsty For..., Alice in Paris, 8-Bit Cooking School, All the Pizza, One for the Road, Food Court, and Grand Opening—Bondi Harvest. Its show, Tiny Kitchen, which focuses on dishes being made in a miniature kitchen, has been featured on ABC News.

In 2014, Tastemade signed a development deal with Ryan Seacrest to create food and lifestyle programming. In 2015, Tastemade hired Julie Nolke to create videos and develop show ideas.

Selected list of programs
 Alice in Paris
 All Nighter
 All the Pizza
 All Up In My Grill
 Day of Gluttony
 Frankie's World
 Frankie vs. The Internet
 Grill Iron
 Local Flight
 Mad Good Food
 Make This Tonight
 Mary's Kitchen Crush
 Off Menu
 One for the Road
 Raw. Vegan. Not Gross
 Struggle Meals
 Thirsty For...
 Tiny Kitchen

References

External links
 

Digital media
Internet properties established in 2012
Internet television channels
Streaming television in the United States
New media
YouTube channels